Felícitas Chaverri Matamoros (9 May 1894 – 6 October 1934) was a Costa Rican pharmacist and poet. In 1917, she became the first woman to obtain a university degree in Costa Rica in the field of Pharmacy.  She also later became the first woman to head the Department of Drugs and Narcotics of the Ministry of Public Health.

Biography
Born as María Felícitas Bernabé Chaverri Matamoros on 9 May 1894 in Atenas, Alajuela, Costa Rica,  Felícitas Chaverri Matamoros was the daughter of Vicente Chaverri Solera and his wife María Teresa Matamoros González. Her family later moved to Heredia, where she completed her school education.

In March 1907, she enrolled in the Liceo de Heredia, where she obtained a bachelor's degree in humanities. In March 1912 she was admitted at the School of Pharmacy despite the opposition from some professors on the ground that the regulations did not authorize the entry of women.

Her graduation on 23 November 1917 with a bachelor's degree in pharmacy made her to become the first woman to obtain a university degree in the country in pharmacy. This also paved the way for the entry of other women in higher education in Costa Rica. Following she worked for the advancement of women's rights particularly in the field of higher education. During the year 1910, she wrote a series of poems, including Desdichada and La Esperanza.

She married professor Clímaco Pérez Arrieta on 25 December 1921. She died in San José on 6 October 1934.

Recognition 
To recognize her contributions in the field of pharmacy, in 2002, she was honoured with La Galería de las Mujeres de Costa Rica.

References

1894 births
1934 deaths